Peristyle, Three Lines is a public art work by artist George Rickey located at the Lynden Sculpture Garden near Milwaukee, Wisconsin. The kinetic sculpture consists of three tapering spear-like forms thrusting vertically; it is installed on the lawn.

References

1963 sculptures
Outdoor sculptures in Milwaukee
Steel sculptures in Wisconsin
Kinetic sculptures in the United States
1963 establishments in Wisconsin